Diaperoeciidae is a family of bryozoans belonging to the order Cyclostomatida.

Genera:
 Desmediaperoecia Canu & Bassler, 1920
 Diaperaecia Canu, 1918
 Diaperoecia Canu, 1918
 Nevianipora Borg, 1944
 Spiritopora Taylor & Gordon, 2003
 Ybselosoecia Canu & Lecointre, 1933

References

Cyclostomatida